Wilshire Grand Center is a  skyscraper in the financial district of downtown Los Angeles, California, occupying the entire city block between Wilshire Boulevard and 7th, Figueroa, and Francisco streets. Completed in 2017, it is the tallest building west of Chicago. The Skyscraper Center lists the Wilshire Grand Center as the 15th-tallest building in the U.S. and the 95th-tallest in the world. It won the Structural Engineering Award 2019 Award of Excellence from the Council on Tall Buildings and Urban Habitat.

The building is part of a mixed-use hotel, retail, observation decks, shopping mall, and office complex. The development of the complex is estimated to cost $1.2 billion. The Wilshire Grand Center includes  of retail,  of Class A office space, and the 889-room InterContinental Los Angeles Downtown. The hotel features a 70th floor Sky Lobby, state-of-the-art fitness center, expansive pool deck and several restaurants including a high-end steakhouse and Spire 73 – the tallest open-air bar in the Western Hemisphere.

History
The original Wilshire Grand Hotel opened in 1952 as the Hotel Statler, on the site of the new Wilshire Grand. In 1950, the city of Los Angeles issued the largest single building permit at the time for the construction of the hotel, which cost over $15 million. The hotel quickly became a landmark of downtown Los Angeles, and over its 59-year lifespan attracted famous guests including President John F. Kennedy and Pope John Paul II.

In 1954, two years after its opening, Hilton Hotels & Resorts purchased the Statler Hotels chain, renaming the hotel the Statler Hilton in 1958. In 1968 Hilton completed a $2.5 million renovation of the hotel and renamed it the Los Angeles Hilton, and later the Los Angeles Hilton and Towers. Reliance Group later purchased the hotel in 1983 and invested $30 million in renovations. Korean Air purchased the Los Angeles Hilton from Reliance in 1989. They changed the hotel's management and it became the Omni Los Angeles Hotel in 1995 and then later the Wilshire Grand Hotel in 1999. Among the major events hosted, this included the 1952 Emmy Awards, the HQ for the 2000 Democratic National Convention and the 2006 Miss Universe Pageant.

It is also part of an urban development effort to revitalize the Figueroa Street corridor of downtown Los Angeles as a vibrant light-and-sign district, similar to New York's Times Square.

The original hotel closed on December 31, 2011. Demolition of the original building began on October 23, 2012, and continued for over a year until November 21, 2013, when a bottoming-out ceremony was held in the  excavated for the towers.

Design
The Los Angeles–based architectural firm, A.C. Martin Partners, oversaw the project and prepared the current design. They took over from Thomas Properties, which managed the early proposals, but which was replaced when the owners became dissatisfied with their approach.

A distinctive feature of the building is its sail-shaped crown which is illuminated with LED lighting at night. The tower will spearhead part of a new planned light and sign district that will extend along the Figueroa Corridor down to L.A. Live. According to recent renderings, it is unclear however to what extent LED lighting and advertising will be applied. Lead designer David C. Martin said that the spire and the entire exterior skin of the tower will be filled with programmable LED lighting. The spire weighs  and adds  in height to the building.

The skyscraper is a distinctive part of the Los Angeles skyline, as it is the first building over 75 feet tall built since 1974 to not feature a "flat roof" design, an integral part of buildings in Los Angeles today. The pattern of buildings in Los Angeles to feature these "flat roofs" was the result of a 1974 fire ordinance which required all tall buildings in the city to include rooftop helipads in response to the Joelma Fire in São Paulo, Brazil, in which helicopters could not be used to effect rescues from the rooftop of the building because of the lack of a landing spot, and could otherwise have prevented many deaths. The Wilshire Grand was granted an exception by the Los Angeles City Fire Department however, as the building includes advances in fire safety and building technology (such as a reinforced concrete central core) which exceeds the city's current fire code. The building nevertheless has a helipad, but it is smaller than the uniform standard used in the city, and, like all helipads, can only be used in emergencies. The helipad is still big enough for a smaller rescue or fire helicopter to land onto.

The elevators in Wilshire Grand Center are supplied by Otis Elevator Company. The four double-deck express cars servicing the hotel's main lobby on the 70th floor travel at 1600 feet per minute.

Construction

Turner Construction received the contracts for both the demolition of the former hotel and the construction of the new tower.  The latter began on February 15, 2014, with a record  pour of concrete in just 20 hours, creating an  base for what would become the tallest building west of the Mississippi.

The foundation is set on bedrock known as the Fernando Formation; this siltstone has been compressed by an ocean that formerly covered the area and is a good base for a building.

More than 12,500 m2 of interior dimension stone and 8,500 m2 exterior stone cladding and paving were used on the project. The sourcing, production, QA/QC and expediting of the stone was carried out by Ramsey Stone Consultants on behalf of Turner Construction.

On March 8, 2016, the topping out ceremony was held.

On March 17, 2016, a construction worker died by suicide after jumping from the 53rd floor, landing on a vehicle below.

On September 3, 2016, the Wilshire Grand became the tallest building in Los Angeles at 1,100 feet. The supertall building opened on June 23, 2017.

The building, while recognized as "tallest" in the city by the Council on Tall Buildings and Urban Habitat, achieves this recognition through the height of its decorative sail and spire rather than highest occupiable floor space.  From the ground, due to local topography, the Wilshire Grand sits visibly lower than other surrounding buildings.  From the vantage of the building's 73rd floor observation deck, the US Bank Tower is markedly higher in elevation, and remains downtown Los Angeles' most prominent visual landmark.

Ownership
The building is owned by the Hanjin Group (through its subsidiary Hanjin International), a South Korean conglomerate that also owns Korean Air. In 2020, Hanjin negotiated a refinancing of the building's debt ($900 million), which came with the condition of paving the way to sell the building further down the road. Because of the COVID-19 pandemic, the value of the building dropped from $1.1 billion to $573 million. From 2011 to 2017, Hanjin got a 60-million tax break from the city of Los Angeles.

Floor plans
Floors basement to 7: Podium building with retail and InterContinental Los Angeles Downtown meeting rooms, gym, and pool.
Floors 11 to 29: Offices
Floors 31 to 68: InterContinental Los Angeles Downtown - hotel rooms
Floor 69: InterContinental Los Angeles Downtown - restaurants - Sora & Dekkadance
Floor 70: InterContinental Los Angeles Downtown - main lobby and Sky Bar
Floor 71: InterContinental Los Angeles Downtown - restaurant - La Boucherie 
Floor 73: InterContinental Los Angeles Downtown - Spire 73, the tallest open-air bar in the Western Hemisphere

Notes

References

External links
 
 

Buildings and structures in Downtown Los Angeles
Skyscrapers in Los Angeles
Hotels in Los Angeles
Office buildings in Los Angeles
Wilshire Boulevard
Metamodernism
Neomodern architecture
InterContinental hotels
2017 establishments in California
Hotel buildings completed in 2017
Office buildings completed in 2017